Hadi Sacko (born 24 March 1994) is a professional footballer who plays as a winger for Turkish club Adanaspor. Born in France, he represents the Mali national team, having made his debut in 2018. He is a former French youth international.

Club career

Bordeaux 
Sacko was born in Corbeil-Essonnes, Essonne. On 31 May 2012, he signed his first professional contract at Bordeaux agreeing to a three-year deal. He was subsequently promoted to the senior team by manager Francis Gillot ahead of the 2012–13 season and assigned the number 12 shirt. He made his professional debut on 20 September 2012 in a UEFA Europa League group stage match against Belgian club Club Brugge.

He was loaned in January 2014 to Ligue 2 side Le Havre, for the remainder of the season.

Sporting CP 
On 28 August 2014, Sacko joined Sporting CP on a six-year contract, with the club stipulating a 60 million euro release clause in his contract.

On 1 February 2016, after scoring 10 goals in 54 games for Sporting CP B and failing to break into the Sporting first team bar one cup appearance, Sacko joined Ligue 2 side Sochaux on loan and scored two goals in 14 appearances whilst on loan.

Loan to Leeds United 
On 5 July 2016, Sacko joined Leeds United on a season-long loan, with a view to a permanent transfer. He was given the squad number 24 shirt for the 2016–17 season. On 7 August, Sacko made his Leeds debut as a substitute against QPR in a 3–0 defeat. He made his first start for Leeds on 10 August in a League Cup victory on penalties against Fleetwood Town. Sacko scored his first goal for Leeds in a 2–1 loss to Birmingham City on 13 August 2016.

He impressed in his early games for Leeds, which also included assists in wins against Sheffield Wednesday and Blackburn Rovers. Sacko scored his second goal for Leeds in a 4–1 victory against Preston North End on 26 December 2016.

After making 38 league appearances and scoring two goals, he returned to Sporting Lisbon after his loan to Leeds had expired.

Leeds United 
On 2 June 2017, Sacko signed a permanent deal with Leeds for an undisclosed fee believed to be £1.5 million to take him up until at least the end of the 2019/20 season. Despite the resignation of head coach Garry Monk, he was the first signing under new owner Andrea Radrizzani.

On 6 August 2017, Sacko made his Leeds United debut as a permanent player in a 3–2 victory at Bolton Wanderers. On 19 September, after a spell out the side, Sacko made a scoring return for Leeds scoring the opening goal of the game, in their League Cup tie against Premier League side Burnley in a penalty shootout victory after a 2–2 draw.

With speculation that he was not in Marcelo Bielsa's plans, on 26 July 2018, Sacko was not given a shirt number for Leeds for the upcoming 2018–19 season for Leeds.

Loan to Las Palmas
On 30 July 2018, Sacko joined Segunda División side UD Las Palmas on a season-long loan from Leeds. He made his debut on 19 August 2018 in a 2–0 win against CF Reus Deportiu. On 25 January 2019, UD Las Palmas announced a termination of his loan spell.

Loan to Ankaragücü
On 29 January 2019, Sacko joined Turkish Süper Lig side Ankaragücü on a 6-month loan. With the club unveiling Sacko with him as a mocked up picture of him as Marvel superhero 'Falcon'.

He scored his first goal for the club on 11 February with a long range striker against Kasimpasa S.K. In total he made 15 appearances for Ankaragücü scoring 3 goals in Süper Lig, helping them avoid relegation.

Denizlispor
On 16 July 2019, Sacko joined Turkish Süper Lig side Denizlispor.

CFR Cluj
On 24 September 2021, Sacko joined Romanian Liga I side CFR Cluj.

International career

France youth sides

Of Malian descent, Sacko has represented France and represented his nation of birth at under-16, under-18, and under-19 and under-20 level.

Mali senior team
After not playing for France senior team (in a competitive game), Sacko was still eligible to play for Mali.

On 15 March 2018, Sacko was called up the senior Mali national team for a friendly against Japan. On 23 March 2018, he made his debut for Mali coming on as a substitute replacing AS Monaco's Adama Traoré in the final 13 minutes in a 1–1 draw against Japan.

Career statistics

Club

International

Honours
Bordeaux
Coupe de France: 2012–13

CFR Cluj
Liga I: 2021–22
Supercupa României runner-up: 2022

France U19
UEFA European Under-19 Championship runner-up: 2013

France U21
Toulon Tournament runner-up: 2014

References

External links 

 
 
 
 
 
 

Living people
1994 births
People from Corbeil-Essonnes
Footballers from Essonne
French footballers
France youth international footballers
Malian footballers
Mali international footballers
Association football wingers
FC Girondins de Bordeaux players
Le Havre AC players
Sporting CP footballers
FC Sochaux-Montbéliard players
Leeds United F.C. players
MKE Ankaragücü footballers
Denizlispor footballers
UD Las Palmas players
CFR Cluj players
Adanaspor footballers
Ligue 1 players
Ligue 2 players
Liga I players
English Football League players
Süper Lig players
TFF First League players
French people of Malian descent